The 1961 UC Riverside Highlanders football team represented the University of California, Riverside as an independent during the 1961 NCAA College Division football season. Led by third-year head coach Jim Whitley, UC Riverside compiled a record of 1–7. The team was outscored by its opponents 159 to 101 for the season. The Highlanders played home games at UCR Athletic Field in Riverside, California.

Schedule

Notes

References

UC Riverside
UC Riverside Highlanders football seasons
UC Riverside Highlanders football